Men Prefer Fat Girls (Les hommes préfèrent les grosses) is a French comedy film directed by Jean-Marie Poiré. It was released in 1981, adapted from a script by Josiane Balasko.

Plot
Lydie has just paid a considerable rent deposit for a new flat when her boyfriend breaks up with her. Now she is alone in a flat she cannot afford. So she starts looking for a flatmate and finally chooses Eva, a model. Eventually Lydie gets to know Eva's friends and that changes her life.

Cast
 Josiane Balasko : Lydie Langlois
 Daniel Auteuil : Jean-Yves
 Dominique Lavanant : Arlette
 Luis Rego : Gérard Langlois
 Ariane Lartéguy : Éva
 Thierry Lhermitte : Hervé
 François Berléand : Julien
 Xavier Saint-Macary : Ronald
 François-Eric Gendron : Adrien
 Martin Lamotte : Paul Berthellot
 Isabelle Mergault : Paul's lover
 Chantal Neuwirth : Postulant for Lydia apartment

References

External links

1981 films
1981 comedy films
French comedy films
1980s French-language films
Films directed by Jean-Marie Poiré
1980s French films